Tudora may refer to:

 Tudora, Botoșani, a commune in Botoşani County, Romania
 Tudora, Ştefan Vodă, a commune in Ştefan Vodă district, Moldova
 Tudora (gastropod), a genus of land snails in the family Pomatiidae